Tijuca is a neighborhood in Rio de Janeiro.

Tijuca may also refer to:

Tijuca (bird)
Tijuca Massif (:pt:Maciço da Tijuca), rocky area in Rio de Janeiro
Tijuca National Park, Rio de Janeiro
Tijuca forest, Rio de Janeiro
Barra da Tijuca, a neighborhood in Rio de Janeiro
 Tijuca, a 1970s-90s knitwear label run by Laura Pearson